Ramalina geniculatella is a species of saxicolous (rock-dwelling), fruticose lichen in the family Ramalinaceae. It is found in the remote tropical island of Saint Helena, where it grows on boulders and cliffs. It was formally described as a new species in 2008 by Dutch lichenologist André Aptroot. The branches of the thallus are about 0.5–1.2 mm wide and about 0.2–0.5 mm thick; they are geniculate (sharply bent) below the apothecia. The species epithet refers to this characteristic feature. Although the branches are greenish-grey, they are covered with whitish pseudocyphellae, which gives the thallus an overall whitish appearance. Thin-layer chromatography shows that the species contains usnic acid, and sometimes boninic acid and protocetraric acids. The photobiont partner is dispersed in irregular groups throughout the medulla.

References

External links
 Pictures of Tropical Lichens – Image of species 

geniculatella
Lichen species
Lichens described in 2008
Taxa named by André Aptroot
Lichens of the middle Atlantic Ocean